The Arizona Sweepstakes is a 1926 American silent Western film directed by Clifford Smith and starring Hoot Gibson. It was produced and distributed by Universal Pictures.

Plot
As described in a film magazine review, a cowboy who goes to a city and is embroiled in a number of gang fights narrowly escapes going to  prison on a false charge of manslaughter. He escapes and hurries home to enter a horse race on the outcome of which, he learns, depends the financial future of the man whose daughter he loves. A detective arrives to arrest him, but he evades capture and rides to victory in the race.

Cast

Preservation
With no prints of The Arizona Sweepstakes located in any film archives, it is a lost film.

References

External links

 
 

1926 films
Lost Western (genre) films
Universal Pictures films
1926 Western (genre) films
Lost American films
American black-and-white films
Films directed by Clifford Smith
1926 lost films
Silent American Western (genre) films
1920s American films
1920s English-language films